American Digger may refer to:

 American Digger (magazine), a bimonthly magazine about the hobby of recovering historical artifacts
 American Digger (TV series), an American reality television series